Landscope is the quarterly journal of Western Australia's Department of Biodiversity, Conservation and Attractions. It publishes technical and popular articles on matters related to the conservation and management of natural resources in Western Australia.

First published in 1985, the magazine was partially a continuation of S.W.A.N.S.: State Wildlife Advisory News Service, a newsletter of Western Australia's Department of Fisheries and Fauna. As of early 2019 there have been 34 volumes.

References

External links
 

1985 establishments in Australia
Nature conservation in Western Australia
Environmental magazines
Magazines established in 1985
Quarterly magazines published in Australia
Magazines published in Perth, Western Australia